Noble Township is one of seven townships in Wabash County, Indiana, United States. As of the 2010 census, its population was 14,230 and it contained 6,476 housing units.

History
The Teague Barn Wabash Importing Company Farm Stable was listed on the National Register of Historic Places in 2002.

Geography

Cities, towns, villages
 Wabash

Unincorporated towns
 Pioneer at 
 Richvalley at 
 South Haven at 
 Sunnymede at 
 Valley Brook at 
(This list is based on USGS data and may include former settlements.)

Adjacent townships
 Paw Paw Township (north)
 Lagro Township (east)
 Liberty Township (southeast)
 Waltz Township (south)
 Butler Township, Miami County (southwest)
 Erie Township, Miami County (west)
 Richland Township, Miami County (northwest)

Cemeteries
The township contains these eight cemeteries: Friends, Hebrew, Huff, Martin Luther, Matlock, Memorial Lawns, Richvalley and Wallace.

Airports and landing strips
 Wabash Municipal Airport

School districts
 Metropolitan School District of Wabash County Schools
 Wabash City Schools

Political districts
 Indiana's 5th congressional district
 State House District 22
 State Senate District 17

References
 United States Census Bureau 2007 TIGER/Line Shapefiles
 United States Board on Geographic Names (GNIS)
 IndianaMap

External links
 Indiana Township Association
 United Township Association of Indiana

Townships in Wabash County, Indiana
Townships in Indiana